Ronald William Artest III (born April 30, 1999) is an American professional basketball player for the Newfoundland Rogues of the The Basketball League  (TBL). He played college basketball for Cal State Northridge and is the son of former NBA All-Star Metta Sandiford-Artest.

High school career
Artest played basketball for two seasons at Palisades High School in Pacific Palisades, California. He led his team in rebounding during his sophomore season. He transferred to Beverly Hills High School following his sophomore season.

Recruiting
Artest was considered a two-star recruit by ESPN.

College career
Artest verbally committed to California State University, Northridge on September 3, 2018. During the 2018–19 season, Artest played in 16 games with no starts, averaging 2.4 points, 2.1 rebounds, and 0.2 assists per game. During the 2019–20 season, he played in 12 games with five starts, averaging 2.1 points, 3.3 rebounds, and 0.5 assists.

Artest's best season in college came during the 2020–21 season, where he played in six games with four starts and averaged 4.3 points, 3.5 rebounds, and 1.3 assists. Following his third college season, he declared for the 2021 NBA G League draft.

Professional career
After going undrafted in the 2021 NBA G League draft, Artest signed with the Sioux Falls Skyforce on October 26, 2021. However, he was waived on November 4.

On January 9, 2022, Artest signed with the Delaware Blue Coats. He was then later waived on January 31, 2022.

On March 9, 2022, Artest signed with the KW Titans of the National Basketball League of Canada, and made his debut in a losing effort to the London Lightning.

On January 13, 2023, it was announced that Artest would be joining the Newfoundland Rogues, under head coach Jerry Williams.

Career statistics

College

|-
| style="text-align:left;"| 2018–19
| style="text-align:left;"| CSUN
| 16 || 0 || 12.4 || .548 || – || .286 || 2.1 || .2 || .2 || .6 || 2.4
|-
| style="text-align:left;"| 2019–20
| style="text-align:left;"| CSUN
| 12 || 5 || 13.7 || .367 || – || .300 || 3.3 || .5 || .3 || .7 || 2.1
|-
| style="text-align:left;"| 2020–21
| style="text-align:left;"| CSUN
| 6 || 4 || 17.8 || .314 || – || .500 || 3.5 || 1.3 || .2 || .7 || 4.3
|- class="sortbottom"
| style="text-align:center;" colspan="2"| Career
| 34 || 9 || 13.8 || .406 || – || .344 || 2.8 || .5 || .2 || .6 || 2.6

References 

1999 births
Living people
American men's basketball players
American expatriate basketball people in Canada
Basketball players from California
Beverly Hills High School alumni
Cal State Northridge Matadors men's basketball players
Delaware Blue Coats players
KW Titans players
People from Beverly Hills, California
Power forwards (basketball)